Phazaca leucocera is a species of moth of the family Uraniidae. It is found in Sri Lanka, southern India, China, Borneo and the Solomon Islands.

Description
Hindwings of male with two tufts of hair on the costa. Male has mark on inner margin of forewings filled with black, and a plum-colored center. The laden marginal band prominent and regular. Hindwings dark chocolate. The medial band plum-colored, bounded by white lines. The marginal band irregular. The tuft in the fold on inner margin pure white. Female with marginal band of both wings lunulate.

Larva sub-cylindrical, by narrowing over the thoracic segments. Head heart- shaped, and blackish. Labrum and base of the antenna whitish. Body is ochreous green with a broad black dorsal band extending in spurs down to each spiracle.

The larvae feed on Canthium species. The larvae rest on the underside of old leaves but only feed on young leaves. Pupation takes place on the soil surface in an ovoid cocoon of silk incorporating particles of earth.

References

Moths described in 1891
Uraniidae